Crepis pulchra is a European species of flowering plant in the family Asteraceae with the common name smallflower hawksbeard. It is widespread across much of Europe as well as in Morocco, Algeria, and western and central Asia. It has also become naturalized in the parts of the United States and in the Canadian Province of Ontario.

Crepis pulchra  is an annual  herb up to 100 cm (40 inches) tall. One plant can produce as many as 40 flower heads, each with as many as 30 yellow ray florets but no disc florets.

Subspecies
 Crepis pulchra subsp. pulchra 
 Crepis pulchra subsp. turkestanica Babc.

References

External links
Discover Life photos
Czech Botany, Crepis pulchra L. – škarda sličná / škarda úhľadná in Czech with photos
photo os herbarium specimen at Missouri Botanical Garden, collected in Missouri USA

pulchra
Flora of Europe
Flora of North Africa
Flora of Central Asia
Flora of Western Asia
Plants described in 1753
Taxa named by Carl Linnaeus